The 2nd Armoured Brigade was an armoured brigade of the British Army, part of the pre-war Regular Army, during the Second World War, originally titled 2nd Light Armoured Brigade.

History
The 2nd Armoured Brigade was part of the 1st Armoured Division when it was sent as part of the British Expeditionary Force (BEF) to France in 1940. It was evacuated from Brest without its heavy equipment.

After being reformed it was sent in November 1941 to North Africa, where it served with the 1st and the 7th Armoured Divisions. It fought at Gazala, El Alamein, the Tunisia Campaign and the Italian Campaign.

Commanders
 Brigadier F. Thornton
 Brigadier Richard McCreery
 Brigadier Raymond Briggs
 Brigadier A.F. Fisher
 Brigadier R. Peake
 Brigadier Richard Goodbody
 Brigadier John Frederick Boyce Combe

Component Units during the Second World War
 The Queen's Bays (2nd Dragoon Guards)
 9th Queen's Royal Lancers
 10th Royal Hussars (Prince of Wales's Own)
1st Bn. The Rifle Brigade
9th Bn. The King's Own Yorkshire Light Infantry

Notes

See also

 British Armoured formations of World War II
 List of British brigades of the Second World War

References

External links
 

Armoured brigades of the British Army in World War II
Armoured brigades of the British Army
Military units and formations established in 1939
Military units and formations disestablished in 1945